Sexually transmitted infections (STIs), also referred to as sexually transmitted diseases (STDs), are infections that are commonly spread by sexual activity, especially vaginal intercourse, anal sex and oral sex. The most prevalent STIs may be carried by a significant fraction of the human population.

References

Sexually transmitted diseases and infections
Infections with a predominantly sexual mode of transmission
Papillomavirus
Infectious disease-related lists